Blambot is the name of an online type foundry and is the alias of typographer Nate Piekos. Blambot specializes in typefaces for use as lettering in both print and online comics. Blambot has provided lettering and design for virtually every major publisher including Marvel Comics, DC Comics, Dark Horse Comics, Image Comics, Oni Press, and more. Blambot's designs have been licensed for video games, movies, advertising, and product packaging for companies like Microsoft, Six Flags Amusement Parks, Charles Schulz & Associates, New Yorker Magazine, The Gap, Penguin Random House, and Sony.

Blambot specialises in logo design, lettering, and custom typefaces, as well as fonts.

References

External links 
 Blambot.com – Official site

Comic book letterers
Independent type foundries